The Westall UFO was a reported UFO sighting in Australia that occurred on 6 April 1966 in Melbourne, Victoria.

Reports 
At approximately 11:00 am on Wednesday, 6 April 1966, students and a teacher from Westall High School, now Westall Secondary College, reported seeing a flying object, described as a grey (or silvery-green) saucer-shaped craft with a slight purple hue and about twice the size of a family car. According to the students, the object was descending, overflew the high school, and disappeared behind a stand of trees. Approximately 20 minutes later the object reportedly reappeared, climbed at speed and departed towards the north-west. Some accounts describe the object as being pursued by five unidentified aircraft.

Explanations
Australian newspaper The Age described it as a weather balloon: "Object Perhaps Balloon – An unidentified flying object seen over the Clayton-Moorabbin area yesterday morning might have been a weather balloon. Hundreds of children and a number of teachers at Westall School, Clayton, watched the object during morning break. The Weather Bureau released a balloon at Laverton at 8:30 am and the westerly wind blowing at the time could have moved it into the area where the sighting was reported". The newspaper also said a number of small aeroplanes circled around it. However, a check later showed that no commercial, private, or RAAF pilots had reported anything unusual in the area.

According to Keith Basterfield, a runaway balloon from the HIBAL high-altitude balloon project used to monitor radiation levels after British nuclear tests at Maralinga is a likely explanation. Basterfield located documents in the National Archives and former Department of Supply indicating a test balloon launched from Mildura may have been blown off course "and came down in Clayton South in a paddock near Westall High School, alarming and baffling hundreds of eyewitnesses, including teachers and students". Basterfield said HIBAL balloons had a white silver appearance and featured a parachute and gas tube trailing from the top, which is consistent with witness descriptions of the object. There were also reports that after the incident, "men in suits" cautioned witnesses not to discuss details of the secret government exercise.

According to skeptic Brian Dunning, "the weather balloon is a likely explanation for the first half of the event". Dunning suggested a nylon target drogue, like a wind sock, towed by one plane for the others to chase and known to be in use by the local RAAF at the time, was "at least one very reasonable possibility for the second half". Dunning added, as years have passed, "descriptions of what was actually seen have now become diluted with made-up descriptions by an unknown number of students who didn't see anything, and there's no way to know which is which".

Media coverage
On 21 January 2016, Network 10's program Studio 10 screened a segment titled: "21 Jan – Melbourne UFO Mystery: 50 Years On" which included live interviews with witnesses who were children at the local school in suburban Melbourne in 1966.

The Phenomenon, a documentary film directed and co-produced by ufologist James Fox, includes content related to the Westall UFO case.

Local culture
A witness reunion was held at Westall Tennis Club Hall, on 8 April 2006, to commemorate the 40th anniversary of the incident.
The City of Kingston created a children's play space, Grange Reserve UFO Park at The Grange Reserve in Clayton South Melway. The park features a silver UFO with red slides to reflect the 1966 Westall UFO Incident.

See also
 Australian Ufology
 Bass Strait Triangle
 Disappearance of Frederick Valentich
 List of UFO sightings
 Ariel School UFO incident

References

Further information

Westall '66: a suburban UFO mystery A MASS UFO SIGHTING A FORTY-FOUR YEAR CONSPIRACY. A MAN SEEKING THE TRUTH Film written By Rosie Jones, with Shane Ryan; Produced by Carmel Mcaloon

1960s in Melbourne
1966 in Australia
April 1966 events in Australia
Australian folklore
UFO sightings